Katrine Engberg (born June 29, 1975 in Copenhagen, Denmark) is a Danish actress, former dancer and choreographer, and author. Some of her films include The Keeper of Lost Causes, Skytten, and 50 Gründe Kopenhagen zu lieben. She has been married to Timm Vladimir since 2003 and has one child, Cassius Vladimir. Her parents are Sysse Engberg and Jan Leon Katlev. 

Engberg is the author of a series of books about Copenhagen detectives Jeppe Kørner and Anette Werner: The Tenant, The Butterfly House, and The Harbor. The books are translated to English by Tara Chase.

A review in the New York Times compares Engberg favourably to the Norwegian author Jo Nesbø.

References

1975 births
Living people
Danish novelists
Danish women novelists
Danish actresses
Danish choreographers